Sinus Honoris  (Latin sinus honōris "Bay of Honour") is located along the western edge of the Mare Tranquillitatis located on the surface of the near side of the moon. The selenographic coordinates of this feature are 11.7° N, 17.9° E. It has a diameter of 112 km.

Sinus Honoris has a wide mouth and is bordered by uneven terrain to the north and southwest. Where the bay joins the mare, rille systems extend to the north and south. The northern system is designated Rimae Maclear, after the crater Maclear just to the east of the bay. At the southern end of the bay entrance is the Rimae Sosigenes, named for the crater Sosigenes to the south. At the west end of the bay is a finger of mare surface that extends to the northwest for almost 100 km.

References

External links

Sinus Honoris at The Moon Wiki
 

Maria on the Moon